Vestignè is a comune (municipality) in the Metropolitan City of Turin in Piedmont, northern Italy, located about 40 km northeast of Turin.

Vestignè borders the following municipalities: Ivrea, Albiano d'Ivrea, Strambino, Caravino, Borgomasino, and Vische. It occupies a hilly territory in the central-eastern lower Canavese geographical area.

References

Cities and towns in Piedmont
Canavese